Masur (also Romanized as Māsūr; also known as Qal‘eh Mansūr) is a village in Koregah-e Gharbi Rural District, in the Central District of Khorramabad County, Lorestan Province, Iran. At the 2006 census, its population was 15,037, in 3,093 families.

References 

Towns and villages in Khorramabad County